Barbara G. Peters (December 22, 1940) is a publisher and bookshop owner.

Life and career 

Peters was born in Winnetka, Illinois.

She holds a BA from Stanford University, an MA from Northwestern University, an MSLS from the University of Tennessee. She was named a Library of Congress Intern on receipt of her Masters in Library Science, and is a member of the Crime Writers of Canada, The British Crime Writers Association, and Mystery Writers of America.  She is a founder of the Independent Mystery Booksellers Association.

In 1989 she founded The Poisoned Pen, one of the world's largest mystery bookstores. In 1997 she co-founded Poisoned Pen Press, a separate corporation dedicated to publishing mystery, making available originals and reprints. It became part of Sourcebooks in 2015.

Peters was named by Publishers Weekly as one of the eleven most important people in Bookselling in their January 3, 2000 issue in an article entitled Eleven for the Millennium.

Awards
She is the winner of the Raven Award from the Mystery Writers of America for the Poisoned Pen bookstore.  She was the 2007 Bouchercon Fan Guest of Honor, and with husband, publisher Robert Rosenwald, the 2008 Bouchercon Lifetime Achievement Award honoree, again for their work with The Poisoned Pen franchise. In 2011 Peters was presented a Lifetime Achievement Award as CEO of a million-dollar company by The Arizona Republic.

Bibliography 
 AZ Murder Goes...Classic  ed. with Susan Malling, 1996. (1998 rev ed. )Nominated for 1997 Edgar Award for Best Critical / Biographical
 AZ Murder Goes...Artful  ed. with Susan Malling, 2001. 
 AZ Murder Goes … Professional, 2002.

References

External links 
 The Poisoned Pen Bookstore
 Poisoned Pen Press
 The Independent Mystery Booksellers Association

1940 births
Living people
American editors
American women editors
Stanford University alumni
Northwestern University alumni
University of Tennessee alumni
American businesspeople
People from Winnetka, Illinois
Anthony Award winners
21st-century American women